Conus hoaraui is a species of sea snail, a marine gastropod mollusc in the family Conidae, the cone snails, cone shells or cones.

These snails are predatory and venomous. They are capable of "stinging" humans.

Description
The size of the shell attains 29.2 mm.

Distribution
This marine species in the Indian Ocean off Réunion.

References

Description of two new endemic Kioconus (Gastropoda, Conidae): K. hoaraui n. sp., from La Réunion and K. malcolmi n. sp., from the Red Sea. Xenophora Taxonomy 7: 15-26

External links
 To World Register of Marine Species
 

hoaraui
Gastropods described in 2015